Teoc Creek may refer to:

 Teoc Creek (Sucarnoochee River tributary), a stream in Mississippi
 Teoc Creek (Yalobusha River tributary), a stream in Mississippi

See also
 Teock Creek